Wilhelm Vorwerg (1899–1990) was a German art director who designed the sets for over fifty films including a number of Rialto Film's series of Edgar Wallace adaptations in the 1960s.

Selected filmography
 In the Name of the People (1939)
 Target in the Clouds (1939)
 The Leghorn Hat (1939)
 Venus on Trial (1941)
 Love Letters (1944)
 Summer Nights (1944)
 1-2-3 Corona (1948)
 The Cuckoos (1949)
 How Do We Tell Our Children? (1949)
 Life Begins at Seventeen (1953)
 Anna Susanna (1953)
 Annie from Tharau (1954)
 The Perfect Couple (1954)
 Heroism after Hours (1955)
 Urlaub auf Ehrenwort (1955)
 Island of the Dead (1955)
 My Father, the Actor (1956)
 Stresemann (1957)
 The Fox of Paris (1957)
 Two Hearts in May (1958)
 The Shadows Grow Longer (1961)
 World in My Pocket (1961)
 Café Oriental (1962)
 The Indian Scarf (1963)
 The Curse of the Hidden Vault (1964)
 The Secret of Dr. Mabuse (1964)
 Room 13 (1964)
 The Monk with the Whip (1967)
 The Gorilla of Soho (1968)
 The Hound of Blackwood Castle (1968)
 The Man with the Glass Eye (1969)

References

Bibliography
 Bergfelder, Tim. International Adventures: German Popular Cinema and European Co-Productions in the 1960s. Berghahn Books, 2005.

External links

1899 births
1990 deaths
German art directors
People from Żarów